Russia attempted to participate in the Eurovision Song Contest 1996 in Oslo, Norway. The Russian entry was selected through a national final, organised by the Russian broadcaster Rossiya Channel (RTR). Andrey Kosinsky was chosen to represent Russia with the song "Ya eto ya". However, Russia was one of seven countries which failed to qualify for the Eurovision final from a pre-qualifying round, so they were not present in Norway.

Background 

Prior to the 1996 contest, Russia had participated in the Eurovision Song Contest two times since its first entry in 1994. To this point, the country's best placing was ninth, which it achieved in 1994 with the song "Vechny strannik" performed by Youddiph. Russia's least successful result was in  when it placed 17th with the song "Kolybelnaya dlya vulkana" by Philipp Kirkorov, receiving 17 points in total. The Russian participation in the contest alternates between two broadcasters: RTR and ORT. The Russian broadcaster for the 1996 contest, who broadcasts the event in Russia and organises the selection process for its entry, was RTR. RTR confirmed their intentions to participate in the contest on 7 February 1996. Along with their participation confirmation, it was announced that RTR would organise a national final to select the 1996 Russian entry.

Before Eurovision

Pesnya dlya Evropy 

Pesnya dlya Evropy (English: A Song for Europe), retroactively often referred to as Nacionalny Otbor na Evrovidenie 1996 (English: National Selection for Eurovision 1996) was the national final format developed by RTR in order to select Russia's entry for the Eurovision Song Contest 1996. The final was held on 2 March 1996 at Shabolovka Studios in Moscow during the television programme Programma A, hosted by 1994 Russian entrant Youddiph and broadcast on RTR. The winner was chosen by an "expert" jury panel, headed by Alla Pugacheva, who would later represent Russia in the 1997 contest.

Format
The competition featured fourteen entries where the Russian entry for Oslo was selected by a sixteen-member jury panel (eight professionals and eight representatives of the public). Each juror represents a specific profession and age category. Each juror gives 1 point to his/her one, two or three favorite entry/entries. The summation of the jury scores determined the winning entry. The jury panel consisted of:
 Tatyana Nikolayeva – head of the entertainment at RTR 
 Galina Golubova – editor-in-chief of the information and music agency "Turne"
 Roman Prygunov – director of video clips
 Irina Otieva – singer, composer
 Yuri Yagudin – arranger, sound engineer
 Tatyana Cherednychenko – Doctor of Art History, musicologist
 Pavel Ovsyannikov – People's Artist of Russia, composer
 Alla Pugacheva – singer, composer, People's Artist of the Soviet Union
 Alexey Rybnikov – Honored Art Worker of Russia, composer
 Galina Masharova – Student of the law faculty
 Mikhail Sevastopolsky – interpreter
 Inga Voronovskaya – Leading Specialist of the Control Accounts Chamber of Moscow
 Igor Stepanov – commercial director of the real estate agency "Amalgam"
 Nadezhda Kobryzhenkova – housewife
 Petr Gorovoy – officer
 Natalia Samoylova – pensioner
 Gennady Videnko – builder

Competing entries
On 7 February 1996, RTR opened the submission period for interested artists and composers to submit their entries until 28 February. Artists and composers were required to possess Russian citizenship. All submitted songs were required to be performed in Russian. A panel of experts appointed by RTR selected 14 entries for the competition from the received submissions.

Final
The final took place on 2 March 1996. Fourteen songs competed and the winner, "Ya eto ya" performed by Andrey Kosinsky, was selected solely by a jury voting. Prior to the competition, a draw for the running order took place on 1 March 1996. In addition to the performances of the competing entries, Youddiph, Gilles Apap, Tamara Gverdtsiteli and cabaret-duo "Akademiya" (Lolita Milyavskaya and Alexander Tsekalo) performed as guests and a music video for Philipp Kirkorov's "Zayka" was premiered.

Controversy 
The song "Nekrasivaya" was later accused of plagiarism from 1967 song of the same name, composed by Sergey Popov. Initially, Popov, for unknown reasons, was not going to sue Timur Gorsky, who performed the song at the national final and Leonid Velichkovsky, who was declared the author of the music. However, Popov ultimately decided to sue both Gorsky and Velichkovsky, but eventually lost the trial, despite the fact that the court recognized Popov as the legitimate author of the song. The reason for the loss was that "It is not possible to find out who put Gorsky and Velichkovsky as authors."

At Eurovision

The Eurovision Song Contest 1996 took place at the Oslo Spektrum in Oslo, Norway, on 18 May 1996. According to the Eurovision rules, the 23-country participant list for the contest was composed of: the previous year's winning country and host nation Norway and the twenty-two countries which had obtained the highest number of points in the special qualifying round. Russia placed joint 26th with 14 points in the qualifying round and thus was not permitted to participate.

Voting 
In the qualifying round, national juries in all competing countries, including Norway, which received an automatic right to compete in the final and thus exempt from the round, listened to the submitted entries on audio tape, with juries required to listen to all songs three times before voting. Each of the eight members on each country's jury awarded their favourite song twelve points, their second-favourite ten points, their third-favourite eight points, with subsequent points being awarded consecutively down to each juror's tenth-favourite song being awarded one point, with the points awarded by all jurors being totalled to determine each country's top ten songs which were awarded points in the same manner.

Notes

References

1996
Countries in the Eurovision Song Contest 1996
Eurovision